Dainik Jagran inext is a broadsheet daily newspaper published in India. It is published by the Jagran Prakashan Ltd., which also publishes world's largest read daily Dainik Jagran.

It is simultaneously published from 12 cities – Agra, Allahabad, Bareilly, Dehradun, Gorakhpur, Varanasi, Kanpur, Lucknow, Meerut, Patna, Ranchi and Jamshedpur from 4 states Uttar Pradesh, Uttarakhand, Bihar and Jharkhand of India.

It was launched on 22 December 2006 in Kanpur.

References
 Media World Wordpress
 Indian Media Observer 

Kanpur
Companies based in Kanpur
Daily newspapers published in India
Newspapers published in Patna
Bilingual newspapers
Publications established in 2006
2006 establishments in Uttar Pradesh